

See also 
 Virginia's 17th congressional district special election, 1808
 Virginia's 21st congressional district special election, 1809
 United States House of Representatives elections, 1808 and 1809
 List of United States representatives from Virginia

Notes

References 

1809
Virginia
United States House of Representatives